Stjepan Vuleta (born 29 October 1993) is a Swiss professional footballer who last played FC Wacker Innsbruck in the Austrian Bundesliga. He plays as a forward.

His father Franjo Vuleta was emigrated from Bosnia and Herzegovina to Switzerland due to the Bosnian war.

Career

Basel
Vuleta came through the ranks in Basel. He played in their U-16 team and was part of the team that won the Swiss Championship in 2008 and 2009. He then played in their U-18 team and again became Swiss U-18 champion, Vuleta played two years in the Basel U-21 team before he signed a three-year professional contract and joined their first team.

Vuleta made his official first team debut, playing in the starting eleven, in a UEFA Champions League preliminary stage match against Flora Tallinn on 24 July 2012, which Basel won 3–0. He played his Swiss Super League debut on 25 August 2012, as he was substituted in, during the 1–2 away defeat in the AFG Arena against St. Gallen.

Wil
On 5 February 2013, it was announced that Vuleta would be loaned out to Wil in the Challenge League to gain playing experience.

Wacker Innsbruck
On 9 July 2013, Vuleta joined the Austrian club FC Wacker Innsbruck on loan from FC Basel for one year.

International
Vuleta has played international football at various age levels, including Swiss under-16s, under-17s, under-19s, and under-21s. He played his debut on for the U-16 team 2 September 2008 in the 6–2 win against Bulgaria.

Titles and honours
Basel
 Swiss Champion at U-16 level: 2007/08 and 2008/09
 Swiss Cup winner at U-16 level: 2007–08
 Swiss Champion at U-18 level: 2009/10

References

External links
 
 

1993 births
Living people
People from Chur
Association football forwards
Swiss men's footballers
FC Basel players
FC Wil players
Swiss Super League players
Swiss Challenge League players
FC Wacker Innsbruck (2002) players
Swiss expatriate footballers
Expatriate footballers in Austria
Swiss expatriate sportspeople in Austria
Swiss people of Bosnia and Herzegovina descent
Sportspeople from Graubünden